The National Electoral Commission (PKW) is the only permanent election commission in Poland. The second permanent electoral organs are komisarze wyborczy (single komisarz wyborczy, election commissioner), which number is 51.

The PKW has 9 members, which are the judges of the Supreme Court of Poland (3), the Constitutional Tribunal (3) and the Supreme Administrative Court of Poland (3). Members of PKW are nominated by the heads of courts and are appointed by the President. There is no cadency of PKW - membership in Commission expires at 70. The head of court which the member of PKW is nominated for, can recall him on a requested reason.

The PKW is the supreme electoral commission in Poland. It has one chairman and two vice chairmen. PKW organises all elections in Poland:
 election of the President of the Republic of Poland;
 elections to Sejm and Senat (lower and upper houses of the Parliament);
 local elections (to gminas/city/powiats councils, for wójt/burmistrz (mayor) and president of the city and sejmiki wojewódzkie (voivodeships councils; sejmik literally means small Sejm));
 elections to the European Parliament in Poland;
 national and local referendums

The PKW appoints Okręgowe Komisje Wyborcze (OKW) (District Electoral Commissions) in elections of President, Sejm and Senat and European Parliament elections. In contrast to PKW, OKW are temporary.

In local elections the terytorialne komisje wyborcze (territorial electoral commissions) are created by the komisarz wyborczy. Each territorial electoral commission conducts elections to appropriate organs:
 wojewódzka komisja wyborcza (voivodeship electoral commission) conduct elections to the sejmik województwa;
 powiatowa komisja wyborcza (powiat electoral commission) conducts elections to the rada powiatu (powiat council);
 gminna komisja wyborcza (commune electoral commission) conducts elections to the rada gminy (commune council) and wójt (mayor of the rural commune);
 miejska komisja wyborcza (city electoral commission) conducts elections to the rada miasta (city council) and burmistrz/prezydent miasta.

All territorial electoral commission are also temporary, in contrast to the elections commissioners.

External links
 

Elections in Poland
Poland